Air Marshal Harvey Smyth,  is a senior Northern Irish Royal Air Force officer, who currently serves as the Deputy Commander Operations. From July 2018, he served as Air Officer Commanding No. 1 Group. Between February 2020 and August 2022, he took up the new post of Director Space, in the Ministry of Defence.

Early life and education
Smyth grew up in Northern Ireland during The Troubles. He was educated at Lurgan College, a non-denominational grammar school in Lurgan, County Armagh. He received a Sixth Form scholarship from the Royal Air Force, and was a member of the Army Cadets while at school.

RAF career
He joined the Royal Air Force (RAF) in 1991, being commissioned as an acting pilot officer on 9 May. His rank was made substantive on 9 May 1992 and advanced to flying officer twelve months later, before he was posted to the Harrier Force in 1995. He was advanced to flight lieutenant on 9 November 1996. Smyth served with No. 1 (Fighter) Squadron as weapons instructor from 1999, and was promoted squadron leader on 1 July 2001. 

He subsequently served in the 2003 invasion of Iraq, for which he was awarded the Distinguished Flying Cross. Smyth was promoted to wing commander on 1 January 2006, and commanded No. 4 Squadron from 1 September 2008 to 31 March 2010. 

Smyth was appointed Officer of the Order of the British Empire (OBE) in the 2011 New Year Honours, was subsequently advanced to group captain, and appointed the United Kingdom's National Director of the Lockheed Martin F-35 Lightning II procurement programme in Washington, D.C. He was aide-de-camp to The Queen from 13 December 2013 to 30 July 2015.

Air officer

As an air commodore, Smyth was appointed Honorary Colonel of the 2nd (Northern Ireland) Battalion, Army Cadet Force from 1 June 2016, and attended the Higher Command and Staff Course at the Defence Academy of the United Kingdom in 2017. Following a stint as the Combined Air and Space Operations Centre Director at the Al Udeid Air Base in Doha, Smyth was promoted air vice marshal and appointed Air Officer Commanding No. 1 Group in July 2018. He was awarded the United States' Legion of Merit, and was granted permission to wear the award by the Queen on 5 April 2019.

Smyth was appointed as the first Director Space in February 2020, and was succeeded in command of No. 1 Group by Air Vice Marshal Allan Marshall. Reporting on Smyth's new post, Defense News wrote that "up to 25 civilians and military personnel involved in finance, policy and capabilities will support the new space directorate" in the Ministry of Defence's Main Building. It also wrote that No. 23 Squadron RAF had been reformed, as a space squadron, "responsible for day-to-day space command-and-control" and the remote control and manoeuvring of satellites. Smyth was appointed Companion of the Order of the Bath (CB) in the 2020 Birthday Honours. He was promoted to air marshal on 26 August 2022, on his appointment as Deputy Commander Operations.

Private activities
Smyth is patron of the Jon Egging Trust which commemorates Flight Lieutenant Jon Egging, who died in an accident in 2011 as part of the Red Arrows flying display team after succumbing to g-LOC.

References

|-

20th-century Royal Air Force personnel
Companions of the Order of the Bath
Living people
Officers of the Legion of Merit
Officers of the Order of the British Empire
Military personnel from Northern Ireland
Recipients of the Distinguished Flying Cross (United Kingdom)
Royal Air Force air marshals
Royal Air Force personnel of the Iraq War
Royal Air Force personnel of the War in Afghanistan (2001–2021)
Year of birth missing (living people)
People educated at Lurgan College